Rhombodera is a genus of praying mantises native to Asia and possessing common names such as shield mantis, hood mantis (or hooded mantis), and leaf mantis (or leafy mantis) because of their extended, leaf-like thoraxes.

Species
These 29 species belong to the genus Rhombodera:

 Rhombodera basalis de Haan, 1842
 Rhombodera boschmai Deeleman-Reinhold, 1957
 Rhombodera brachynota Wang & Dong, 1993
 Rhombodera crassa Giglio-Tos, 1912
 Rhombodera doriana Laidlaw, 1931
 Rhombodera extensicollis Serville, 1839
 Rhombodera extraordinaria Beier, 1942
 Rhombodera fratricida Wood-Mason, 1878
 Rhombodera handschini Werner, 1933
 Rhombodera javana Giglio-Tos, 1912
 Rhombodera keiana Giglio-Tos, 1912
 Rhombodera kirbyi Beier, 1952
 Rhombodera laticollis Burmeister, 1838
 Rhombodera latipronotum Zhang
 Rhombodera lingulata Stal, 1877
 Rhombodera megaera Rehn, 1904
 Rhombodera mjobergi Werner, 1930
 Rhombodera morokana Giglio-Tos, 1912
 Rhombodera ornatipes Werner, 1922
 Rhombodera palawanensis Beier, 1966
 Rhombodera papuana Werner, 1929
 Rhombodera rennellana Beier, 1968
 Rhombodera rollei Beier, 1935
 Rhombodera sjostedti Werner, 1930
 Rhombodera stalii Giglio-Tos, 1912
 Rhombodera taprobanae Wood-Mason, 1878
 Rhombodera titania Stal, 1877
 Rhombodera valida Burmeister, 1838
 Rhombodera zhangi Wang & Dong, 1993

See also
List of mantis genera and species
Mantodea of Asia
Leaf mantis
Shield mantis

References

Further reading

 
 
 
 

 
Mantodea of Asia
Mantidae
Mantodea genera